Prabodhan Vidyalaya School is a private Catholic secondary boarding school, located in Daryapur, Amravati, in the state of Maharashtra, India. The co-educational school was founded in 1983 by the Society of Jesus from the Maharashtra Prabodhan Seva Mandal in Nashik.

See also

 Catholic Church in India
 Education in India
 List of Jesuit schools

References  

Jesuit secondary schools in India
1983 establishments in Maharashtra
Educational institutions established in 1983
High schools and secondary schools in Maharashtra
Christian schools in Maharashtra
Private schools in Maharashtra
Boarding schools in Maharashtra